John Armstrong England CMG (12 October 191118 June 1985) was an Australian politician and Administrator of the Northern Territory.

Early life
Born in Sydney, John England attended state schools and then Brisbane Boys' College.

Career 
He was a bank officer before undertaking military service from 1942 to 1946. From 1947 he was a farmer near Grenfell in New South Wales. In 1960, England was elected to the Australian House of Representatives as the Country Party member for Calare, in the by-election caused by the resignation of John Howse. He held the seat until his retirement in 1975.

In 1978, he was appointed Administrator of the Northern Territory, a position he held until 1981.

In the New Year's Honours of 1979, he was appointed a Companion of the Order of St Michael and St George.

Death 
He died in 1985.

References

National Party of Australia members of the Parliament of Australia
Members of the Australian House of Representatives for Calare
Members of the Australian House of Representatives
1911 births
1985 deaths
Administrators of the Northern Territory
Australian Army personnel of World War II
Australian Companions of the Order of St Michael and St George
20th-century Australian politicians
Australian colonels